The WS2400 is a 8x8 special heavy-duty truck developed and built by Wanshan Special Vehicle and used by the People's Liberation Army of the People's Republic of China as a transporter erector launcher (TEL) platform and is a reverse engineered version of the MAZ-543 missile Transporter erector launcher.

Description
A TEL that is widely used by the PLA due to the sheer numbers of Chinese SRBM assets. The WS2400 is one of the principal mobile workhorse/platforms in mounting and firing China's short-range ballistic missiles.

Wanshan Special Vehicle (湖北三江航天万山特种车辆有限公司) is a wholly owned subsidiary of China Aerospace Sanjiang Space Co. Ltd (中国航天三江集团)], which is in turn a subsidiary of  China Aerospace Science and Industry Corporation (CASIC)]. The advantage of the WS2400 compared to the MAZ is that it utilizes a German diesel engine, transmission and hydraulics manufactured by Wanshan in China, built using technologies transferred from ZF Friedrichshafen and Allison Transmission.

The WS2400 has a maximum payload capacity of 22 tons, as such, it is used as the base for a number of conventional and ballistic missile systems the DF-11 SRBM and A-100 MRL platforms.

The much larger WS2500 and WS2600 is a more developed evolution of the WS2400 meant to carry MRBMs and IRBMs.

Variants
WS2500
WS2600

See also 

 MAZ-7310
 HEMTT
 TA580/TAS5380
 MAN gl

References

 WS2400 Truck

Military trucks of China
Military vehicles of the People's Republic of China